Olenecamptus nicobaricus is a species of beetle in the family Cerambycidae. It was described by Stephan von Breuning in 1936.

References

Dorcaschematini
Beetles described in 1936